Special Area No. 4 is a special area in central Alberta, Canada. It is a rural municipality similar to a municipal district; however, the elected council is overseen by four representatives appointed by the province, the Special Areas Board.

Special Area 4 has one provincial park, Gooseberry Lake Provincial Park. Lakes include Grassy Island Lake and Sounding Lake.

Geography

Communities and localities 
The following urban municipalities are surrounded by Special Area No. 4.
Cities
none
Towns
none
Villages
Consort
Veteran
Summer villages
none

The following hamlets are located within Special Area No. 4.
Hamlets
Altario
Compeer
Kirriemuir
Monitor

The following localities are located within Special Area No. 4.
Localities

Ensleigh
Hemaruka
Idamay
Little Gem
Lloyds Hill

Loyalist
Neutral Valley
Pemukan
Sounding Lake
Wiste

Demographics 

See also 
List of communities in Alberta
List of improvement districts in Alberta
List of municipal districts in Alberta
List of municipalities in Alberta

References

External links 

 
1969 establishments in Alberta
Special areas in Alberta